Cao Xuân Dục (1843–1923) was a scholar, historian-mandarin, and court adviser in the Nguyễn dynasty, Vietnam.

History 
Cao Xuân Dục was born in Thịnh Mỹ, Diễn Châu, Nghệ An. In 1876, he entered Vietnamese Imperial examination and was awarded the degree of provincial graduate (舉人 - cử nhân), in the same class with the famous anti-French patriot Phan Đình Phùng from Hà Tĩnh.

He served under the Nguyễn Emperors Đồng Khánh and Thành Thái and held several important government posts including Governor-General of Hưng Yên (1889) and minister of education (1907). He was one of the four top advisers to the Emperor during the Vietnam-France conflict in the early 20th century.

When Trương Như Cương, a pro-French collaborator, coerced his colleagues to sign a petition to Thành Thái to promote him to viceroy, Dục refused to sign. Instead he wrote a quick poem on the petition. 

He was later vilified by Cương's group and demoted to a lowly local post in Hoàng Xá outside of Hanoi. 

A relief of Cao Xuân Dục was sculptured on a wall in a cave in this local region to commemorate his righteousness.

Cao Xuân Dục retired in 1913 to concentrate on building his library, Long Cương Bảo Tàng Thư Viện (named after his pseudonym), collecting and maintaining Vietnamese literature.

A street in Ho Chi Minh City was named after Cao Xuân Dục

Writings
Cao Xuân Dục made significant contribution in maintaining Vietnamese culture and literature in 19th and 20th century. He spent many years writing, collecting, copying, re-writing and preserving valuable books including:
Annals of Đại Nam
Quốc triều chính biên toát yếu
Quốc triều khoa bảng lục - records of biographies of graduates of major imperial exams

See also 

 Confucian court examination system in Vietnam
 Nguyễn dynasty

Notes 
 

 

1843 births
1923 deaths
20th-century Vietnamese historians
Nguyen dynasty officials
19th-century Vietnamese historians